In the United States, a recess appointment is an appointment by the president of a federal official when the U.S. Senate is in recess. Under the U.S. Constitution's Appointments Clause, the President is empowered to nominate, and with the advice and consent (confirmation) of the Senate, make appointments to high-level policy-making positions in federal departments, agencies, boards, and commissions, as well as to the federal judiciary. A recess appointment under Article II, Section 2, Clause 3 of the Constitution is an alternative method of appointing officials that allows the temporary filling of offices during periods when the Senate is not in session. It was anticipated that the Senate would be away for months at a time, so the ability to fill vacancies in important positions when the Senate is in recess and unavailable to provide advice and consent was deemed essential to maintain government function, as described by Alexander Hamilton in No. 67 of The Federalist Papers.

In modern times, the Senate is in session nearly year-round, making the recess appointment mechanism far less necessary or useful for upkeep of government function. Nonetheless, in recent times this power has also been controversially used as a political tool to temporarily install an unpopular nominee by sidestepping the Senate's role in the confirmation process; the Senate has taken measures from time to time to prevent a president from making recess appointments, specifically by holding pro forma sessions. The Supreme Court affirmed that pro forma sessions are sufficient to prevent recess appointments and addressed other intricacies of the practice in NLRB v. Noel Canning (2014). Appointments made during a recess must be confirmed by the Senate by the end of the next session of Congress, or the appointment expires. In current practice, this means that a recess appointment must be approved by roughly the end of the next calendar year and thus could last for almost two years, if made early enough in the year.

Constitutional text
Article II, Section 2, Clause 3, commonly known as the Recess Appointment Clause, provides that,

History

Presidents since George Washington have made recess appointments. Washington appointed South Carolina judge John Rutledge as Chief Justice of the United States during a congressional recess in 1795. Because of Rutledge's political views and occasional mental illness, however, the Senate rejected his nomination, and Rutledge attempted suicide and resigned. Almost every president has used recess appointments to appoint judges, over 300 such judicial recess appointments before 2000, including ten Supreme Court justices.

New Jersey judge William J. Brennan was appointed to the Supreme Court by President Dwight D. Eisenhower in 1956 by a recess appointment. This was done in part with an eye on the presidential campaign that year; Eisenhower was running for reelection, and his advisors thought it would be politically advantageous to place a northeastern Catholic on the court. Brennan was promptly confirmed when the Senate came back into session. Eisenhower, in a recess appointment, designated Charles W. Yost as United States Ambassador to Syria. Eisenhower made two other recess appointments, Chief Justice Earl Warren and Associate Justice Potter Stewart.

According to the Congressional Research Service, President Ronald Reagan made 240 recess appointments (average 30 per year) and President George H. W. Bush made 77 recess appointments (average 19 per year). George H. W. Bush appointed Lawrence Eagleburger as Secretary of State during a recess in 1992; Eagleburger, as Deputy Secretary of State, had in effect filled that role after James Baker resigned.

President Bill Clinton made 139 recess appointments (average of 17 per year).

President George W. Bush made 171 recess appointments (average of 21 per year). During the last two years of the Bush administration, Democratic Senate Majority Leader Harry Reid sought to prevent further recess appointments. Bush promised not to make any during the August recess that year, but no agreement was reached for the two-week Thanksgiving break, in November 2007. As a result, Reid did not allow adjournments of more than three days from then until the end of the Bush presidency by holding pro forma sessions. Prior to this, there had been speculation that James W. Holsinger would receive a recess appointment as Surgeon General of the United States.

President Barack Obama made 32 recess appointments (through February 1, 2015), all to full-time
positions. Over what would have traditionally been the 2011–12 winter recess of the 112th Congress, the Republican-controlled House of Representatives did not assent to recess, specifically to block Richard Cordray's appointment as Director of the Consumer Financial Protection Bureau. Both the House and Senate continued to hold pro forma sessions.

In August 2017, nine pro forma sessions were set up to block President Donald Trump from making recess appointments. The concern was that Trump might dismiss Attorney General Jeff Sessions, and try to name his successor while Congress was in recess. Pro forma sessions continued to be held until January 2019. They were held on December 31, 2018, and again on January 2, 2019, the last full day of the 115th United States Congress, that lasted several minutes.

On April 15, 2020, while Congress was holding pro forma sessions due to the recess during the COVID-19 pandemic, President Trump threatened to adjourn both houses of Congress in order to make recess appointments for vacant positions such as the Federal Reserve Board of Governors and the Director of National Intelligence. However, the U.S. Constitution only grants the President the authority to adjourn Congress if it is unable to agree on a date of adjournment, and both Speaker of the House Nancy Pelosi and Senate Majority Leader Mitch McConnell indicated that they would not alter the planned date of January 3, 2021.

Congressional action to prevent recess appointments
The Senate or House may seek to block potential recess appointments by not allowing the Senate to adjourn under Article 1, Section 5, Clause 4 of the Constitution, which provides that both Houses must consent to an adjournment. This tactic is especially used when either House of Congress is controlled by a different party than that of the president, the Senate or House may seek to block potential recess appointments by not allowing the Senate to adjourn for more than three days, blocking a longer adjournment that would allow recess appointments to be made.

In order to combat this tactic from Congress the President can adjourn Congress under Article II section 3 of the constitution that states

According to Article II Section 2 of the constitution the President can appoint or fill up the vacancies that happen during a recess without the Senate's approval, but those positions will end at the end of the next legislative session unless Congress approves the appointment.

Legality of intra-session appointments
According to Henry B. Hogue, of the Congressional Research Service's Government and Finance Division:

It has been argued that as the clause was originally understood, it was expected that if the Senate was in session when an office became vacant, the president would make a standard advice-and-consent appointment at that time. In Federalist No. 67, Alexander Hamilton wrote:

Another argument maintains that recess appointments were to be made only during inter-session recesses, which during the early days of the country lasted between six and nine months, and were therefore required to prevent important offices from remaining unfilled for long periods. The view holds that the current interpretation allows appointments to be made during recesses too brief to justify bypassing the Senate.

Historically, presidents tended to make recess appointments when the Senate was adjourned for lengthy periods. Since World War II, presidents have sometimes made recess appointments when Senate opposition appeared strong in the hope that appointees might prove themselves in office and then allow opposition to dissipate. Most recently, however, as partisanship on Capitol Hill has grown, recess appointments have tended to solidify opposition to the appointee.

Obama's challenge 
Regardless of the Senate continuing to hold pro forma sessions, on January 4, 2012, President Obama appointed Richard Cordray and others as recess appointments. White House Counsel Kathryn Ruemmler asserted that the appointments were valid, because the pro forma sessions were designed to, "through form, render a constitutional power of the executive obsolete" and that the Senate was for all intents and purposes recessed. Republicans in the Senate disputed the appointments, with Senate Minority Leader Mitch McConnell stating that Obama had "arrogantly circumvented the American people" with the appointments. It was expected that there would be a legal challenge to the appointments.

On January 6, 2012, the Department of Justice Office of Legal Counsel issued an opinion regarding recess appointments and pro forma sessions, claiming, "The convening of periodic pro forma sessions in which no business is to be conducted does not have the legal effect of interrupting an intrasession recess otherwise long enough to qualify as a "Recess of the Senate" under the Recess Appointments Clause. In this context, the President therefore has discretion to conclude that the Senate is unavailable to perform its advise-and-consent function and to exercise his power to make recess appointments".

Judicial challenges
However, this was widely disputed. The first such challenge was announced in April 2012, disputing a National Labor Relations Board ruling made following the Obama appointments.

On January 25, 2013, in the first circuit case to rule on the validity of the January 4, 2012, appointments, Chief Judge David Sentelle, writing for a unanimous three-judge panel for the U.S. Court of Appeals for the D.C. Circuit, wrote "an interpretation of 'the Recess' that permits the President to decide when the Senate is in recess would demolish the checks and balances inherent in the advice-and-consent requirement, giving the President free rein to appoint his desired nominees at any time he pleases, whether that time be a weekend, lunch, or even when the Senate is in session and he is merely displeased with its inaction. This cannot be the law." 

Also, on March 16, 2013, the Third Circuit joined the D.C. Circuit and held that the March 2010 appointment of Craig Becker to the NLRB was invalid because he was not appointed between sessions.

On June 26, 2014, in a 9–0 ruling, the United States Supreme Court validated this practice of using pro forma sessions to block the president from using the recess appointment authority.  Justice Stephen Breyer wrote that the Constitution allows for the Congress itself to determine its sessions and recesses, that "the Senate is in session when it says it is", and that the President does not have the unilateral right to dictate Congressional sessions and thus make recess appointments. However, the decision allows the use of recess appointments during breaks within a session for vacancies that existed prior to the break.  Justice Breyer also noted that the President could force a recess if he had enough congressional support: "The Constitution also gives the President (if he has enough allies in Congress) a way to force a recess. Art. II, §3 ('[I]n Case of Disagreement between [the Houses], with Respect to the Time of Adjournment, [the President] may adjourn them to such Time as he shall think proper'). Moreover, the President and Senators engage with each other in many different ways [*28] and have a variety of methods of encouraging each other to accept their points of view. Regardless, the Recess Appointments Clause is not designed to overcome serious institutional friction. It simply provides a subsidiary method for appointing officials when the Senate is away during a recess."

See also
List of positions filled by presidential appointment with Senate confirmation
Unsuccessful recess appointments to United States federal courts
Federal Vacancies Reform Act of 1998

References

Further reading
 Tillman, Senate Termination of Presidential Recess Appointments, 101 Nw. U. L. Rev. Colloquy 82 (2007).
Kalt, Response, Keeping Recess Appointments in Their Place, 101 Nw. U. L. Rev. Colloquy 88 (2007).
 Tillman, Terminating Presidential Recess Appointments: A Reply to Professor Brian C. Kalt, 101 Nw. U. L. Rev. Colloquy 94 (2007).
Kalt, Keeping Adjournments in Their Place, 101 Nw. U. L. Rev. Colloquy 108 (2007).
 
 Recess Appointments Made by President George W. Bush, January 20, 2001- October 31, 2008 Congressional Research Service
 Recess Appointments Made by President Barack Obama Congressional Research Service

Article Two of the United States Constitution
Clauses of the United States Constitution
Executive branch of the government of the United States
Presidency of the United States